Sara Elizabeth Mole Crowley is a Professor of Molecular Cell Biology and Provost's Envoy for Gender Equality at University College London and the Great Ormond Street Hospital. She works on diseases caused by genetic changes, in particular neurodegenerative diseases that impact children.

Early life and education 
Mole studied the Natural Sciences Tripos at the University of Cambridge and graduated in 1983. She moved to Imperial College London for her doctoral studies and was awarded a PhD in 1986 for analysis of the SV40 large T antigen.

Research and career 
Mole continued to a postdoctoral fellowship at the Imperial Cancer Research Fund, before moving back to the University of Cambridge for a research position. In 1992, Mole was appointed a lecturer in the Department of Paediatrics at University College London. She became a Group Leader in the Medical Research Council Laboratory for molecular cell biology in 2005. She investigates the genetic basis of neuronal ceroid lipofuscinosis diseases. 

Mole has extensively investigated the lysosomal disease Batten disease, writing a textbook on the subject and setting up a mutation database and on-line resource web site for patients and their families. Batten disease is characterised by the accumulation of autofluorescent material in lysosomes and presents with visual failure, seizures, cognitive impairment and decline in motor abilities. 

Mole has contributed to the identification and characterization of thirteen genes that cause Batten disease. Treatments for the majority of these diseases exist only as palliative care. She led a multi-million pound Horizon 2020 research project on Batten disease biology, BATCure, partnering with 14 European institutions and the UK Batten Disease Family Association. BATCure looks to develop new treatments for patients suffering from types of Batten disease without therapeutic development; including CLN3 disease. 

Mole uses the model organism Schizosaccharomyces pombe to study CLN3 disease, and found that whilst most young patients with juvenile CLN3 disease neuronal ceroid lipofuscinosis share an intragenic deletion this does not totally abolish function of the CLN3 gene. She showed the some CLN8 disease is caused by large genomic deletions.

In 2013 Mole was awarded the University College London prize for public engagement. In 2018 she was awarded the University College London Provost's Excellence Award for her contribution to gender equality. She serves as Provost's Envoy for Gender Equality, leading the University College London submission to Athena SWAN and leading initiatives to promote equality and inclusion across campus. She led the first successful application for a departmental gold Athena SWAN award at University College London. At University College London, Mole leads the Women in Leadership network.

Selected publications 
Her publications include;

References 

Living people
British molecular biologists
British women biologists
Alumni of the University of Cambridge
Alumni of Imperial College London
Academics of University College London
Year of birth missing (living people)